The TC Energy Center is a highrise that represents one of the first significant examples of postmodern architecture construction in downtown Houston, Texas. The building has been formerly known as the RepublicBank Center, the NCNB Center, the NationsBank Center, and the Bank of America Center. The building was completed in October 1983 and designed by award-winning architect Johnson/Burgee Architects, and is reminiscent of the Dutch Gothic architecture of canal houses in The Netherlands. It has three segmented tower setbacks, each with "a steeply pitched gabled roofline that is topped off with spires".  The tower was developed by Hines Interests and is owned by a joint venture of M-M Properties and an affiliate of the General Electric Pension Trust.

The banking center is housed in a separate building, due to construction problems, and has a three-story lobby. There are 32 passenger elevators each finished with wood panels that include Birdseye Maple, Macassar Ebony, Italian Willow, Tamo, and Kevazingo. The building contains an art gallery in the lobby and plans to host curated exhibitions.

The building was renamed for TC Energy in 2019, which serves as the company's US headquarters, and is the largest tenant in the building.

Background
At 56 stories the TC Energy Center is the 55th tallest building in the United States and is the seventh tallest building in Texas.

The northeast corner of the structure houses a building within a building.  On the site is the main Western Union building and when relocation of the telegraph cables proved unfeasible, a new structure was built over the site and the existing structure was incorporated into the new building intact. The stone used for the exterior is red Swedish granite, giving the building a "dark pink" appearance.

Accident
On June 9, 2001, the building was the site of an accident that took place during Tropical Storm Allison. Building security warned individuals that the below-grade parking levels were in danger of flooding and instructed persons working late in the building to move vehicles to upper levels of the garage. Kristie Tautenhahn, an employee of the law firm Mayer, Brown & Platt, went to move her vehicle parked on sub-level 3 at 10:30 UTC (05:30 CDT) which by that time was completely submerged.  She drowned in an elevator car when it filled with water as it descended to the lower floor of the garage.

Tenants
 Mayer Brown has its Houston office in Suite 3400.
TC Energy has its US Head Office in the building.

Gallery

See also

 Tallest buildings in Texas
List of tallest buildings in the United States

References

External links

Official Site - TC Energy Center
 The Bank of America Center at Glass Steel and Stone

Office buildings completed in 1983
Skyscraper office buildings in Houston
Philip Johnson buildings
John Burgee buildings
Bank buildings in Texas
Postmodern architecture in Texas